42 Radar Squadron is a unit of the Canadian Forces under Royal Canadian Air Force. The squadron operates the AN/TPS-70 radar from CFB Cold Lake in Alberta, Canada.

History
42 Aircraft Control and Warning (AC&W) Squadron of the Canadian Air Force became operational in June 1955. The Squadron was originally used to provide radar control to the CF-100s flying around CFB Cold Lake. In October 1962, 42 AC&W Squadron became 42 Radar Squadron in the Semi-Automated Ground Environment (SAGE) system as part of the 28th NORAD Region.

References

External links
42 Radar Squadron official website

Royal Canadian Air Force squadrons
Military units and formations established in 1962